A Sally Lunn is a large bun or teacake, a type of batter bread, made with a yeast dough including cream and eggs, similar to the sweet brioche breads of France. Sometimes served warm and sliced, with butter, it was first recorded in 1780 in the spa town of Bath in southwest England. As a tea cake it is popular in Canada, England and New Zealand. 

There are many variations of Sally Lunn cake in American cuisine, some made with yeast, with variations that add cornmeal, sour cream or buttermilk to the basic recipe. The recipe was brought to the United States by British colonists, and new American variations were developed through the 18th and 19th centuries. It is claimed in one 1892 newspaper article that Sally Lunn bread became known as "Washington's breakfast bread" because it was so admired by George Washington.

Origins 
The origins of the Sally Lunn are shrouded in myth. One theory is that it is an anglicisation of "" (French for "sun and moon"), representing the golden crust and white base/interior. The Sally Lunn Eating House in Bath, England, claims that the recipe was brought to Bath in the 1680s by a Huguenot refugee called Solange Luyon, who became known as Sally Lunn, but there is no evidence to support this theory. "Food Britannia" reiterates the Solange Luyon theory but cites the "tea shop which sells them" as the source of the information.  A 2015 report by The Daily Telegraph states "It is a charming tale, but, sadly, a fictitious one – there is little evidence for Mademoiselle Luyon, whatever the museum in the restaurant’s basement might tell you".

There is a passing mention of "Sally Lunn and saffron cake" in a 1776 poem about Dublin by the Irish poet William Preston. The first recorded mention of the bun in Somerset is as part of a detox regime in Philip Thicknesse's 1780 guidebook to taking the waters at Bath. Thicknesse describes how he would daily see visitors drinking 2–3 pints of Bath water and then "sit down to a meal of Sally Lunns or hot spungy rolls, made high by burnt butter!"  He recommends against the practice as his brother died after this kind of breakfast:"Such a meal, few young men in full health can get over without feeling much inconvenience".

There is little historical evidence for Sally Lunn as a person. The Gentleman's Magazine of 1798 uses Sally Lunn as an example during a discussion of foods named after people—"a certain sort of hot rolls, now, or not long ago, in vogue at Bath, were gratefully and emphatically styled 'Sally Lunns. But it is not until 1827 that a historical person is described by a correspondent of William Hone using the pseudonym "Jehoiada", who says she had sold the buns on the street "about thirty years ago". A baker called Dalmer had bought out her business and made it highly successful after he composed a special song for the vendors, who sold the buns from mobile ovens. The earliest evidence of commercial production is an 1819 advertisement for the Sally Lunn "cakes" sold by W. Needes of Bath, bread and biscuit maker to the Prince Regent.

Sally Lunns were mentioned together with muffins and crumpets by Charles Dickens in 1844 in his novel The Chimes. A year later, in 1845, Eliza Acton gave a recipe in Modern Cookery for Private Families, describing it as a version of "Solimemne – A rich French breakfast cake, or Sally Lunn". Solilemmes is a kind of brioche that is served warm and popularised by the great Parisian chef Marie-Antoine Carême in a book of 1815. Carême claimed the solilem originated in Alsace but there is no evidence to support that claim; he may have taken the idea from contacts in Bath and then tried to disguise the origins of a recipe that came from France's great enemy.

Sally Lunn's house
The building now known as the Sally Lunn Eating House is at 4 North Parade Passage (formerly Lilliput Alley) in Bath  The site was originally occupied by the south range of Bath Abbey, and the lowest floor level dates to the reconstruction of the abbey after a great fire in 1137. The masonry oven in the basement dates from that time.

Journals in the 17th century published accounts of visitors to the various coffee houses and several assembly rooms in and along Terrace Walk & North Parade, but Sally Lunn is not mentioned in any of those reports. 

After the Reformation, the ruins came into the hands of the Colthurst family of Wardour Castle, who sold the site to John Hall of Bradford on Avon in 1612. In 1622, Hall leased the site to George Parker, a carpenter who built the current house. The Hall estate was later acquired by the 2nd Duke of Kingston, who sold the house to William Robinson in 1743. There may have been baking on a small scale during the 1700s, but it only became the main commercial use of the building around the turn of the 20th century.

In the mid-19th century, Sarah Fricker, a tallow maker, occupied the building.  Subsequent owners include Edward Culverhouse, a cab proprietor, (1904–1921) and Mrs Griffiths, a grocer (1922–1930). The building fell into a bad state of repair and was vacant in 1932–33.

Marie Byng-Johnson, an artist, moved to Bath with her daughter, a violinist, c. 1926, taking up lodgings at 13 Abbey Churchyard and giving piano lessons. She moved to 4 North Parade passage in 1934, trading as "Sally Lunn Ltd".

Byng-Johnson opened the building as a tea-room specialising in Sally Lunn buns, promoting them with a story that she had discovered an ancient document in a secret panel above the fireplace, explaining that Sally Lunn was a young French Huguenot refugee who brought the recipe to Bath around 1680. Remarkably, despite the importance of this priceless and historic document, she lost it.

The property has been a Grade II* listed building since June 1950. The summary states that "Sally Lunn, a pastry cook and baker, was a tenant in 1680" but cites no source to confirm that information. It is possible that the English Heritage saw the sign on the wall (erected c. 1970) and took the claim at face value.

In popular culture
Sally Lunns are mentioned alongside muffins and crumpets by Charles Dickens in his novel The Chimes, first published in 1844 and frequently reprinted.

"Sally-lunn" is also mentioned in the Anthony Trollope short story "The Lady of Launay."

The Sally Lunn was later mentioned in Gilbert and Sullivan's comic opera The Sorcerer:

CHORUS:
Now to the banquet we press; now for the eggs and the ham;
Now for the mustard and cress, and now for the strawberry jam!
Now for the tea of our host, now for the rollicking bun,
Now for the muffin and toast, and now for the gay Sally Lunn!
WOMEN: The eggs and the ham, and the strawberry jam!
MEN: The rollicking bun, and the gay Sally Lunn!  The rollicking, rollicking bun!

See also

 Bath bun
 Boston bun
 Fruit bun
 Hot cross bun
 List of British breads
 List of buns
 Manchet
 Ralph Allen's Town House, Bath
 Tsoureki

References

External links
History of the Sally Lunn Bun at Foods of England
The Sally Lunn Eating House

English cuisine
British breads
Sweet breads
Yeast breads
Buns
Culture in Bath, Somerset
History of Bath, Somerset
Grade II* listed houses in Somerset
Grade II* listed buildings in Bath, Somerset
Cuisine of the Southern United States
American breads